Kate Robinson (born 19 January 1977) is a New Zealand rower.

Robinson was born in 1977. Her parents are Isabel and Rob Robinson, and she has one sibling. Her father was the New Zealand Police Commissioner from 2000 to 2005.

In 2001, she won silver at the World Championships in Lucerne, Switzerland as bow in the four with team mates Jackie Abraham-Lawrie (bow), Rochelle Saunders (3), and Nicky Coles (stroke).

References 

1977 births
Living people
New Zealand female rowers
World Rowing Championships medalists for New Zealand
21st-century New Zealand women